Toos may refer to:

 Toos (given name) including a list of people with the name
 Tous, Iran, or Toos, an ancient city in Razavi Khorasan Province in Iran
 Toos, later merged into Schönholzerswilen, a municipality in Münchwilen district, Thurgau, Switzerland

See also

Toes (disambiguation)
Too (disambiguation)
Tool (disambiguation)
Toot (disambiguation)
 Toon (disambiguation)
Toots (disambiguation)
Topos (disambiguation)
TOS (disambiguation)